Ibrayevo (İbray) is a rural locality (a village) and the administrative centre of Ibrayevsky Selsoviet, Kugarchinsky District, Bashkortostan, Russia. The population was 155 as of 2010. There are 3 streets.

Geography 
Ibrayevo is located 10 km northwest of Mrakovo (the district's administrative centre) by road. Igubayevo is the nearest rural locality.

References 

Rural localities in Kugarchinsky District